Patrick or Pat Robertson may refer to:

 Pat Robertson (born 1930), American media mogul, Southern Baptist minister, and college administrator
 Pat Robertson (footballer) (1895–1947), Australian rules footballer for Essendon
 Patrick Robertson, Lord Robertson (1794–1855), Scottish judge
 Patrick Robertson (soccer) (born 1986), American soccer player 
 Patrick Robertson (musician) (born 1977), Australian musician and songwriter
 Patrick Francis Robertson (1807–1885), British Member of Parliament for Hastings
 Patrick Robertson (set designer) (1922–2009), British theatre designer